Fierle Peak is a sharp peak in Antarctica,  high, standing  east-southeast of Dyrdal Peak at the southern extremity of Saratoga Table in the Forrestal Range, Pensacola Mountains, Antarctica. It was mapped by the United States Geological Survey from surveys conducted by U.S. Navy air photos, 1956–66. It inherits its namesake from the Advisory Committee on Antarctic Names for Gerard R. Fierle, a meteorologist at Ellsworth Station during the winter of 1957.

References 

Mountains of Queen Elizabeth Land
Pensacola Mountains